Niklaus Fleury (born 10 May 1945) is a Dutch former professional tennis player.

Fleury was the Dutch national singles champion in 1969 and made his Davis Cup debut that year, going on to feature in six ties for his country. He also won a further seven men's doubles national titles with Jan Hordijk (all in succession) and another five in mixed doubles. In 1967 he featured in the mixed doubles main draw at Wimbledon.

See also
List of Netherlands Davis Cup team representatives

References

External links
 
 
 

1945 births
Living people
Dutch male tennis players